James K. Scribner (June 13, 1828 – April 3, 1910) was a member of the Wisconsin State Assembly.

Biography
Scribner was born on June 13, 1828 in Westport, Connecticut. He was a miller by trade. He was widowed in 1897 when his wife, Laura née Wheeler, died. Scribner died on April 3, 1910 in Minneapolis.

Assembly career
Scribner was a member of the Assembly during the 1876 session from Eldorado. He was a Republican.

References

People from Westport, Connecticut
People from Fond du Lac County, Wisconsin
Republican Party members of the Wisconsin State Assembly
Millers
1828 births
1910 deaths
19th-century American politicians